"Good Vibes" is a song by French-Israeli singer Nadav Guedj. It was released on 19 August 2015 through Unicell as the second single from his debut studio album, Nadav Guedj (2016).

Track listing

Chart performance

Release history

References

2015 songs
2015 singles
Number-one singles in Israel